Wangaloa is a small coastal settlement in South Otago, New Zealand. It is located to the north of the mouths of the Clutha River the beach area, close to the town of Kaitangata.  There is access to Wangaloa Beach from the Kaitangata Golf course. Wangaloa is connected to Toko Mouth,  to the north, by a coastal road, and to Kaitangata,  to the west, by a road which crests a low range of coastal hills.

The name of Wangaloa is from the southern dialect of Māori, and means long bay (equivalent to Whangaroa in standard Māori).

Wangaloa was home to an open cast coal mine which operated as part of the Kaitangata coal field from 1945 to 1989. The area surrounding the former mine is being extensively re-landscaped as a recreational reserve.

References

External links
The Archaeology and European History of the Wangaloa Block (PDF)
Wangaloa Mine Restoration
Kaitangata Golf Club
Geoview.info Wangaloa

Populated places in Otago
Clutha District
Coal mines in New Zealand
Mining communities in New Zealand